Zeaxanthin epoxidase (Zea-epoxidase) is an enzyme with systematic name zeaxanthin,NAD(P)H:oxygen oxidoreductase. This enzyme catalyses the following chemical reaction

 zeaxanthin + 2 NAD(P)H + 2 H+ + 2 O2  violaxanthin + 2 NAD(P)+ + 2 H2O (overall reaction)
(1a) zeaxanthin + NAD(P)H + H+ + O2  antheraxanthin + NAD(P)+ + H2O
(1b) antheraxanthin + NAD(P)H + H+ + O2  violaxanthin + NAD(P)+ + H2O

Zeaxanthin epoxidase is a flavoprotein (FAD) that is active under conditions of low light.

References

External links 
 

EC 1.14.13